0I (zero I) or 0-I may refer to:

0i, an abbreviation for Zero Install software distribution
0i, an abbreviation for an Iron (golf) numbered zero
0i, an abbreviation for zero Inflation
0i, an abbreviation for zero initial in Syllable onset
0i, an abbreviation for zero ideal; see List of zero terms

See also
I0 (disambiguation)